Northend is a village that straddles the border of the two English counties of Buckinghamshire and Oxfordshire. The eastern half is in the civil parish of Turville in Buckinghamshire, while the western half is across the border into Oxfordshire, in the Watlington parish.

References

Villages in Oxfordshire
Watlington, Oxfordshire
Villages in Buckinghamshire
Wycombe District